Ryan Heffington (born June 7, 1973) is an American dancer and choreographer based in Los Angeles. He was nominated for two Grammy Awards for choreographing the music videos for Arcade Fire's "We Exist" (2013) and Sia's "Chandelier" (2014), winning a VMA Award for the latter.

Early life
Heffington was born in Yuba City, California. He has danced since he was young, but has never received any formal training. He moved from Yuba City to Los Angeles at the age of 18.

Career
In the mid-1990s, Heffington co-created the sexy Psycho Dance Sho' with Bubba Carr, and in the late 2000s he was the artistic director for the experimental modern dance company Hysterica. From 2006 to 2009, Heffington lead the dance troupe Fingered, which combined fast-paced Martha Graham-style choreography with genderbending costumes designed by Heffington. He has performed at bars and clubs, as well as MOCA, LACMA, the Dorothy Chandler Pavilion, Saturday Night Live, Walt Disney Concert Hall, the UCLA Hammer Museum and Coachella.

Heffington is best known for choreographing the music videos for Arcade Fire's "We Exist" (2013) and Sia's "Chandelier" (2014), both of which were nominated for Grammy Awards, and the latter of which won him a VMA Award. Other Sia videos that Heffington has choreographed include "Elastic Heart", "Big Girls Cry", "Cheap Thrills" and "The Greatest". Sia and Heffington's collaborations have "done more to raise the standards of dance in pop music than nearly any current artist integrating the forms." He has also worked with FKA Twigs and Britney Spears, and made several appearances on RuPaul's Drag Race. 

Heffington created the choreography for the science fiction series The OA, which debuted on Netflix in December 2016. 

More of his work can be seen in television, film and onstage around the world, including the first season finale of HBO's Euphoria, Prime Video's Transparent, Spike Jonze's commercials for Kenzo (winner of the highest honor, the Titanium Lion @ the 2017 Cannes Film Festival), Apple's “Welcome Homepod” featuring FKA Twigs, and Edgar Wright's critically acclaimed 2017 film Baby Driver.

Heffington was the owner of The Sweat Spot, a dance studio in Silver Lake, Los Angeles. The space offered classes for both professional dancers and beginners in a casual atmosphere. Heffington decided to open the studio after he had hosted a roving event called Sweaty Sundays. Although the studio closed in 2020, Heffington still hosts Sweatfest and Wet Wednesdays on Instagram to thousands of dancers live. 

More recently, Heffington choreographed Lin-Manuel Miranda's 2021 film adaptation of the Jonathan Larson musical tick, tick... BOOM! and made his acting debut in Paul Thomas Anderson's Licorice Pizza.

Filmography

Music Videos

Commercials

Awards and nominations

References

External links
 

American choreographers
Performance art in Los Angeles
1973 births
Living people
Primetime Emmy Award winners